This was a new event in the 2017 ITF Women's Circuit.

Emina Bektas and Alexa Guarachi won the title, defeating Kaitlyn Christian and Sabrina Santamaria in the final, 5–7, 6–3, [10–5].

Seeds

Draw

References
Main Draw

LTP Charleston Pro Tennis - Doubles
LTP Charleston Pro Tennis